The  is an annual marathon sporting event in Tokyo, the capital of Japan. It is a World Athletics Platinum Label marathon and one of the six World Marathon Majors. It is sponsored by Tokyo Metro.

History

The first Tokyo Marathon was held on 18 February 2007. However, years prior to 2007, Tokyo Marathon actually consisted of two marathons -  the Tokyo International Marathon which took place on even years, and Tokyo - New York Friendship International Marathon which took place on odd years.  In the inaugural year, 1981, both marathons took place.  However, because it was not possible to support two marathons a month apart in the same city, from 1982, the alternating format went into effect.

The 2007 marathon was also a representative selection race of the 2007 World Championships in Athletics in Osaka. The total number of participants was set at 30,000. Of that, 25,000 people signed up for the marathon, and 5,000 signed up for the 10K run.

Masakazu Fujiwara became the race's first Japanese male winner at the fourth edition.

In February 2014, Dickson Chumba won in a record time of 2:05:42. This was only the second time a runner ran below 2h06 in Japan, after Tsegaye Kebede in Fukuoka Marathon (December 6, 2009). His runner-up, Tadese Tola did also run below 2:06, in a time of 2:05:57.

In January 2020, rock musician Hyde released the song "Believing in Myself" as a single inspired by the event. Due to the COVID-19 epidemic, only elite runners were invited to the 2020 Tokyo Marathon. All other participants were given a deferral to 2021.

The 2021 Tokyo Marathon was postponed to 17 October 2021 due to the pandemic. Additionally, all overseas runners were barred from competing, with their entries automatically transferred to 2023.

Course

2007–2016
Tokyo Metropolitan Government Building -> Tokyo Imperial Palace -> Hibiya Park (10 km Finish) -> Shinagawa -> Ginza -> Nihonbashi -> Asakusa -> Tsukiji -> Tokyo Big Sight (Full Marathon Finish)

2017–
Tokyo Metropolitan Government Building -> Iidabashi -> Nihonbashi (10 km Finish) -> Asakusa -> Koto (Halfway Point) -> Nihonbashi -> Ginza -> Shinagawa -> Hibiya Park -> Tokyo Station (Full Marathon Finish)

Registration

Numbers 

When registrations closed for the 2015 Tokyo marathon 308,810 people had applied for the full marathon, and 1,014 had applied for the 10 km race. This gave a total number of 309,824 applicants and an oversubscription rate of 11.3 for the marathon.

For the 2019 event, there were 331,211 applicants. 330,271 of the applications were for the full marathon and 940 were for the 10 km race.

Elite field 

Apart from the invited athletes, runners registered with JAAF who satisfy the following requirement can register in the Elite field.

In 2014, the requirements were:

See also
Tokyo International Marathon
Tokyo International Women's Marathon

Notes

References

External links

 Tokyo Marathon official website
 Tokyo Marathon Elevation Chart

 
Marathons in Japan
Sports competitions in Tokyo
Events in Tokyo
Recurring sporting events established in 2007
2007 establishments in Japan
World Marathon Majors
Winter events in Japan
Athletics in Tokyo
Fujisankei Communications Group
Wheelchair marathons